Malekzadeh (also Romanized as Malekzādeh; also known as Malakzāden) is a village in Sis Rural District, in the Central District of Shabestar County, East Azerbaijan Province, Iran. At the 2006 census, its population was 957, in 219 families.

References 

Populated places in Shabestar County